There have been two Royal Navy ships that have borne the name HMS Nairana;

  was a conversion to handle seaplanes.
  was an escort carrier that served in World War II, later transferred to the Dutch Navy as 

Royal Navy ship names